The Cromford Canal ran  from Cromford to the Erewash Canal in Derbyshire, England with a branch to Pinxton. Built by William Jessop with the assistance of Benjamin Outram, its alignment included four tunnels and 14 locks.

From Cromford it ran south following the  contour line along the east side of the valley of the Derwent to Ambergate, where it turned eastwards along the Amber valley. It turned sharply to cross the valley, crossing the river and the Ambergate to Nottingham road, by means of an aqueduct at Bullbridge, before turning towards Ripley. From there the Butterley Tunnel took it through to the Erewash Valley.

From the tunnel it continued to Ironville, the junction for the branch to Pinxton, and then descended through fourteen locks to meet the Erewash Canal at Langley Mill. The Pinxton Branch became important as a route for Nottinghamshire coal, via the Erewash, to the River Trent and Leicester and was a terminus of the Mansfield and Pinxton Railway.

In addition to purely canal traffic, there was a lively freight interchange with the Cromford and High Peak Railway, which traversed the plateau of the Peak District from Whaley Bridge in the north west, and which descended to the canal at High Peak Junction by means of an inclined plane.

Origins
At the end of the eighteenth century an extension was proposed to the Erewash Canal by various interested parties who wished to encourage coal mining further north. The suggestion was declined by the canal company, so local businessmen, including Joseph Outram, the father of Benjamin decided to go ahead on their own, asking William Jessop to design one between Langley Mill and Cromford, with a branch to Pinxton. This would carry coal to Cromford, which was becoming industrialised, and limestone from the area for the growing iron industry. Also important would be lead from Wirksworth and cotton from the Cromford mills. The connection to the Erewash Canal would provide an outlet to the Trent and Mersey Canal and the rest of the country.

The canal therefore attracted the support of some powerful figures such as Philip Gell of Hopton Hall and Sir Richard Arkwright - the latter initially at least. Matters were taken out of the Erewash Canal owners hands, for, without their co-operation, there was the implicit threat that a competing canal would be built to the Trent. The major opposition came from the water-powered mill owners along the Derwent, of which there were many, downstream of the proposed canal, fearful of loss of flow in dry weather. Since, between Cromford and Pinxton, the canal would be level, Jessop was able to give reassurance, carefully downplaying the problem of the descent, with its locks, to Langley Mill.

However, with the assistance of Benjamin Outram, he also spent over a year measuring the flow rate of the Derwent, a precaution which was invaluable when the bill was placed before Parliament. He also proposed to make the summit pound deep enough that it could be replenished on Sundays when the mills were closed, and hold enough water to supply the locks for a week even in the driest weather.

The length from the Erewash Canal would be built to match, accessible to barges from the Trent. Through the Butterley Tunnel and along the narrow Derwent valley it would be to narrow boat standards, similar to the Trent and Mersey.

At the last minute before the Bill was to be presented to Parliament, Richard Arkwright raised a problem. The assumption had been that water would come from Cromford Sough, the drainage from the Wirksworth lead mines. Arkwright complained that the canal crossed his land and insisted that water should be obtained from the river by raising the height of the weir at Masson Mill. This was an unwelcome complication (which would mainly benefit Arkwright himself and his mill) but the canal Committee reluctantly agreed.

Construction
The canal obtained its Act of Parliament in 1789. Perhaps because they had quoted too little, basing their estimates on Jessop's cost predictions which may themselves have been too optimistic, the contractors soon found themselves in financial difficulties and, at the end of 1790, simply walked off the site. Benjamin Outram hastily took over full management control and was awarded a salary increase. In January 1792 there was a problem when the Amber Aqueduct failed but, by May, the canal to the east of Butterley was virtually complete and most of the earthworks to the west.

Most of the heading was through soil, with some coal measures and iron ore deposits, the final tunnel being lined through most of its length.

By 1793 the company had a balance in hand of only £273 and the cost had risen to half as much again as Jessop's original estimate. Nevertheless, the canal was showing an income, unfinished though it was.

In August, however, there were problems with the Derwent Aqueduct which required considerable modification. The spandrel walls had parted due to the horizontal forces imposed by the canal, and a longitudinal split had opened up in the arch. In his report to the canal committee, Jessop gave his opinion that the use of Crich lime, being unusually pure, had delayed the setting of the mortar. Later writers, with the benefit of engineering knowledge acquired after Jessop's time, have suggested that the spandrel walls were simply too slender for the forces imposed. At any rate, the arch was partly dismantled and steel tie bars and lateral reinforcing arches were installed, together with external buttresses. This Jessop did at his own expense.

In the end, despite costing about twice the initial estimate of £42,697 (£ in ), the canal opened in 1794 and was a financial success.

Operation
Jessop had based his initial predictions for the expected returns on the carriage of limestone from Cromford and Crich and coal from Pinxton. However, the canal itself encouraged new enterprises.
The canal mostly carried coal, lead and iron ore, some extracted from inside the Butterley Tunnel. Copper was brought from as far away as Ecton Hill in Staffordshire and the canal opening the way for lead from Ecton, as well as Wirksworth to be taken to the Lead Market at Hull and chert from Bakewell to the Potteries. It also allowed the finished products of the area to be exported widely, the Butterley Company's castings and Arkwright's spun cotton. The opening of the Derby Canal and the  Nottingham Canal, both in 1796, further facilitated the latter's trade with these textile centres.

Although Arkwright had suggested that water should be drawn from the Derwent (by raising his weir at Masson Mill and feeding it via an aqueduct to Cromford Meadows - thus improving his plans for quarries behind Willersley and adding extra power to his mill wheels at the expense of the Canal Company), the canal committee had secretly no intention of so doing. The Proprietors changed the line of the canal to its present terminus, where a connection was made to the Cromford sough, even though they had to purchase the land from Arkwright at £1000 and landscape (at unknown cost) the grounds of his then house. Water could be drawn from the sough at night as well as on Sundays, when Cromford Mill was not working. Coming from underground, it was slightly warm, and it was said that it never froze. (Arkwright had been using the sough water to power Cromford Mill since the previous century.) The opening of the Nottingham Canal provided further water via the Butterley Reservoir, almost above Butterley Tunnel and on the summit level of the Cromford Canal.

The sign illustrated (left) was displayed at both ends of the Butterley tunnel, and stressed the importance of only using the narrow tunnel in any one direction at particular times. There are reported instances of fines levied for non-compliance with these rules.

In 1819 the Mansfield and Pinxton Railway opened up trade with Mansfield including moulding sand for the foundries.

In 1831, the Cromford and High Peak Railway opened a route up to Manchester

The canal also carried limestone from the Butterley Company's quarry at Crich with a plateway to the Amber Wharf at Bullbridge. In an attempt to avoid using cable-haulage or a rack and pinion system, a remarkable steam engine, the "Steam Horse" was tried out in 1813.

In 1840 when the North Midland Railway was built, George Stephenson was faced with the problem at Bullbridge of taking the line over the road but under the canal, thus the Bullbridge Aqueduct, in its final form, placed the river, road, railway and canal at four levels. 

In 1846 the mining beneath Wirksworth had reached such a depth that Meerbrook Sough was built, draining into the Derwent near Whatstandwell, which deprived both Arkwrights mill and the canal of water, leaving the latter with only that from Butterley Reservoir. Accordingly, the canal owners first hired a pump and then built the Leawood Pump House in 1849 buying a Cornish type beam engine from Grahams of Elscar.

Decline
In 1802 the canal had carried over 150,000 tons and by 1842 nearly 300,000, then in 1849, the Manchester, Buxton, Matlock and Midlands Junction Railway was built alongside as far as Ambergate, which reached Manchester in 1867. A further line to Pye Bridge was built in 1875. By 1888 trade had shrunk to 45,000 tons a year.

In 1846, Parliamentary assent was granted to merge with the MBM&MJR. The sale was not carried through until 1852 by which time the Midland Railway and the LNWR had assumed joint control and, with railway lines from Rowsley through Ambergate to the north and south, it was being used for little more than local traffic.

In 1889, subsidence closed the  Butterley Tunnel for four years, and further subsidence in 1900 closed the Tunnel permanently. Most of the canal was abandoned in 1944 with the exception of a half-mile (800m) stretch to Langley Mill which was abandoned in 1962. The Bullbridge Aqueduct was removed in 1968 when the Ripley road was widened.

Restoration

After closure, the canal was taken over by the British Waterways Board and acquired by Derbyshire County Council in 1974. Between 1968–69 and 1989 the 5 miles between Cromford and Ambergate were restored either partly or wholly by the Cromford Canal Society [CCS] together with the beam engine (the Leawood Pump) which was restored to full operation, pumping water from the River Derwent to the Canal above. CCS ran horse-drawn passenger boats (up to 15,000 passengers a year) on the 1½-mile section from Cromford to Leawood and steamed the beam engine on regular occasions. The lower section from Leawood to Leashaw (through Gregory Tunnel) was restored to navigation but storm damage to embankments prevented its use. CCS ceased to exist in 1990 and this part of the canal has nearly reverted to pre-restoration condition.

In March 2013 dredging began on a  length between Leawood Pumphouse and Cromford Wharf with the aim of making it navigable for narrowboats. This section is now open for trips on an historic cargo narrowboat, Birchwood, now electric-powered.

The towpath from Ambergate to Cromford is now a very popular walking route, with the Derwent Valley Line adjacent, Leawood Pump House and the High Peak Junction of the Cromford and High Peak Railway.

Friends of the Cromford Canal
The Friends of the Cromford Canal is a charitable organisation whose aim is to see the restoration of the Cromford Canal for the benefit of the general public. The society promotes the restoration of the Canal to navigation, and to connect it to the national inland waterway system at the junction with the Erewash Canal at Langley Mill. The group runs a trip boat, Birdswood, between Cromford Wharf and Leawood Pump House, although even after dredging of the section in 2013 it is quite shallow. English actor Brian Blessed is the president of Friends of the Cromford Canal. His voice gives the recorded safety announcement for the tripboat Birdswood on the Canal.

See also

Canals of Great Britain
History of the British canal system
Cromford and High Peak Railway

Notes

References
 Schofield, R.B. (2000) Benjamin Outram 1764–1805 : an engineering biography, Cardiff: Merton Priory, 
 Cooper, B. (1991) Transformation of a Valley: The Derbyshire Derwent, Cromford: Scarthin (originally by London: Heinemann, 1983),

Further reading

External links
 
 
 The Friends of the Cromford Canal
 Heanor & District Local History Society
 images & map of mile markers seen along the Cromford canal
 Cromford Canal records at Baker Library Special Collections, Harvard Business School.

Sites of Special Scientific Interest in Derbyshire
Tourist attractions of the Peak District
Canals in Derbyshire
Local Nature Reserves in Derbyshire
Canals opened in 1794
1794 establishments in England